Simeon Kayyara, also spelled Shimon Kiara (Hebrew: שמעון קיירא),  was a  Jewish-Babylonian halakhist of the first half of the 8th century. Although he lived during the Geonic period, he was never officially appointed as a Gaon, and therefore does not bear the title "Gaon".

Rabbinic sources often refer to Kayyara as Bahag, an abbreviation of Ba'al Halakhot Gedolot ("author of the Halakhot Gedolot"), after his most important work.

Name
The early identification of his surname with "Qahirah," the Arabic name of Cairo (founded 980), was shown by Solomon Judah Loeb Rapoport to be impossible. Neubauer's suggestion of its identification with Qayyar in Mesopotamia is equally untenable. It is now assumed that "Kayyara" is derived from a common noun, and, like the Syro-Arabic "qayyar," originally denoted a dealer in pitch or wax.

 Halakhot Gedolot 

According to both medieval authorities like Geonim Sherira and Hai ben Sherira, and modern scholars like Abraham Epstein, Kayyara is the author of Halachot Gedolot (הלכות גדולות), a work on Jewish law dating from the Geonic period. However, others have attributed the work to Yehudai Gaon.

 References 

 Robert Brody, The Geonim of Babylonia and the Shaping of Medieval Jewish Culture'', Yale 1998
 Its bibliography:
 A. Epstein, in Ha-Goren, iii. 46 et seq.;
 A. Harkavy, Teshubot ha-Ge'onim, pp. xxvii., 374 et seq.;
 J.L. Rapoport, in Kerem ?emed, vi. 236;
 Schorr, in Zunz Jubelschrift (Hebr. part), pp. 127 et seq.;
 He-haluk, xii. 81 et seq.;
 Weiss, Dor, iv. 26, 32 et seq., 107, 264;
 Brüll, in his Jahrb. ix. 128 et seq.;
 Grätz, Gesch. v. 234;
 idem, in Monatsschrift, vii. 217 et seq.;
 S. T. Halberstam, ib. viii. 379 et seq., xxxi. 472 et seq.;
 I. Halevy, Dorot ha-Rishonim, iii. 200 et seq.;
 see also the bibliography of the article Yehudai Gaon.

Geonim
9th-century rabbis
Exponents of Jewish law
Authors of books on Jewish law